Lugaw, also spelled lugao, is a Filipino glutinous rice dish or porridge. Lugaw may refer to various dishes, both savory and sweet. In Visayan regions, savory lugaw are collectively referred to as pospas. Lugaw is widely regarded as a comfort food in the Philippines.

Description
Lugaw is traditionally made by boiling glutinous rice (Tagalog: malagkit; Visayan: pilit). Regular white rice may also be used if boiled with excess water. The basic version is sparsely spiced, usually only using salt, garlic, and ginger; or alternatively, sugar. Heartier versions are cooked in chicken, fish, pork or beef broth. It is regarded as a comforting and easy-to-digest food, typically prepared for breakfast and during cold and rainy weather. It is also commonly served to people who are sick or bedridden, and to very young children and the elderly.

Lugaw is usually eaten hot or warm, since the gruel congeals if left to cool. It can be reheated by adding a little bit of water. Dessert versions can be eaten cold or even partly frozen.

According to the National Commission for Culture and the Arts, lugaw is among the earliest documented Filipino food. Lugaw is listed in the 1613 dictionary Vocabulario de la lengua tagala which defined lugaw as a "rice mixed with milk or water or of both (porridge)"

Variants
Lugaw can be paired or augmented with numerous other dishes and ingredients.

Savory

Most savory versions of lugaw are derived from or influenced by Chinese-style congee, introduced by Chinese-Filipino migrants. It has diverged over the centuries to use Filipino ingredients and suit the local tastes. Filipino savory lugaw are typically thicker than other Asian congees because they use glutinous rice. They are traditionally served with calamansi, soy sauce (toyo), or fish sauce (patis) as condiments Savory lugaw are usually paired with meat or seafood dishes. The most common being tokwa't baboy (cubed tofu and pork).
Arroz caldo – lugaw heavily infused with ginger and garnished with toasted garlic, scallions, and black pepper with a hard-boiled egg. Most versions also add safflower (kasubha) which turns the dish characteristically yellow.
Goto – lugaw made with goto (tripe) and ginger. It is garnished with toasted garlic, scallions, and black pepper.

Dessert

Sweet versions of lugaw are more characteristically Filipino. They include:
Binignit – lugaw made with coconut milk (gata) and various slices of fruit, jelly desserts (like sago, tapioca pearls, kaong, etc.), and root crops (like sweet potato, taro, and ube). It is known by many other regional names, like giná-tan, tabirák, alpahor, ginettaán, ginat-ang lugaw, and kamlo.
Champorado – lugaw with home-made chocolate and milk. It is a native adaptation of the Mexican drink champurrado. It is traditionally paired with dried fish (tuyo), but can be eaten as is as a dessert.
Ginataang mais – lugaw made with coconut milk and sweet corn.
Ginataang munggo – lugaw with toasted mung beans, sugar, and coconut milk. Corn may also be added.

Use as a political symbol 
The lugaw has been widely associated with the political camp of Philippine Vice President Leni Robredo, originating from her 2016 election campaign during which Robredo's supporters sold the rice porridge as part of a fundraising effort. Robredo's detractors and internet trolls have pejoratively used the tags "Leni Lugaw" or the "Lugaw Queen" after photos of her serving lugaw circulated online. In response, Robredo has since adopted the tag during political events and campaigns, including serving lugaw to attendees of her 2022 Philippine presidential election bid announcement.

See also

 Congee
 Filipino cuisine
 Filipino Chinese cuisine
 List of rice dishes

Other Philippine rice cooking techniques:
Sinangag
Bringhe
Kiampong
Kuning
Sinigapuna

References

Rice dishes
Philippine desserts
Philippine rice dishes